Jocoro Fútbol Club are a Salvadoran professional football club based in Jocoro, Morazán, El Salvador.

History
The club was founded in 1991. In 1992, The club played in their very first season of professional football in Liga Mayor B (currently the Terecera division), the club would spend two seasons before winning promotion to the segunda division. 
The club spent years trying to promotion to the first division, they made the Playoff-relegation game three times in 1998, 1999 and 2001, however they always fell short.

The club finally succeeded in gaining promotion to the first division when they won the Apertura 2017 defeating El Roble de Ilobasco o aggregate, then winning the Clausura title defeating Brujos de Izalco of Izalco 6-3 on aggregate, winning automatic promotion to the primera division.
The club would go on to enjoy its most successful years through the 2020-21 season they would earn a best-ever third-place result. Just missing on the final losing 2-1 on aggregate against Aguila.

In the 2022 Apertura, Jocoro reached the Primera division final for the first time in the club's history under the direction of Jose Romero. However they lost 2-0, which allowed FAS to become champions for the nineteenth time

Honours

Primera División: 1
 Runners up: (1) : Apertura 2022

Segunda Division: 2
 Champions: (2) :Torneo Apertura 2017 , Clausura 2018

Tercera Division: 1
 Champions: (2) : 1995, Torneo Clausura 2016

Stadium
 Complejo Deportivo Tierra de Fuego (2017-2018, 2020-)
 Estadio Luis Amílcar Moreno
 Estadio Correcaminos, Gotera, Morazan (2018-2019)
 Estadio Jose Ramon Flores Berrios, Santa Rosa Lima (2019-2020)

Jocoro plays its home games at Complejo Deportivo Tierra de Fuego in Jocoro. However the club stated the Complejo Tierra de fuego was to small to play in the primera division therefore they moved their games to the bigger Estadio Correcaminos.

Sponsorship
Companies that Jocoro currently has sponsorship deals with for 2023–2024 includes:
 Milan – Official Kit Suppliers
 Caja de Credito Jocoro – Official sponsors
 Inversions bendicion de dios – Official sponsors
 Electrolit – Official sponsors
 L& A  – Official sponsors
 Las Perlitas – Official sponsors

Club records
 First victory in the Primera Division for Jocoro: 3-2 Firpo, July 29, 2018
 First goalscorer in the Primera Division for Jocoro: Paraguayan Jorge Caceres v Firpo 29 July 2018
 100th goal in the Primera Division for Jocoro: Honduran Ovidio Lanza v Atletico Marte 4 January 2021
 Largest Home victory, Primera División: 5-1 v Limeno 25 October 2020
 Largest Away victory, Primera División: 3-0 v Pasaquina, 29 October 2018
 Largest Home loss, Primera División: 1–3 v Chalatenango, 4 November 2018
 Largest Away loss, Primera División: 1-4 v A.D. Isidro Metapan, 7 April 2019
 Highest home attendance: 2,000 v Primera División, 2018
 Highest away attendance: 1,000 v Primera División, San Salvador, 2018
 Highest average attendance, season: 49,176, Primera División
 Most goals scored, season, Primera División: 25, Apertura 2018
 Worst season: Segunda Division 2002-2003: 1 win, 4 draws and 17 losses (7 points)

Individual records
 Record appearances (all competitions): TBD, 822 from 1957 to 1975
 Record appearances (Primera Division): Nelson Alvarenga, 121 from 2018 to 2022
 Most capped player for El Salvador: 63 (0 whilst at Jocoro), Juan Jose Gomez
 Most international caps for El Salvador while a Jocoro player: 1, Alexander Campos
 Most caps won whilst at Jocoro: 1, Alexander Campos.
 Record scorer in league: Paraguayan Diego Areco, 21
 Most goals in a season (all competitions): TBD, 62 (1927/28) (47 in League, 15 in Cup competitions)
 Most goals in a season (Primera Division): Honduran Carlos Lanza, 10

Current squad
As of February 5, 2023.

Players with dual citizenship
   Allan Benitez

Out on loan

In

Out

Reserve Team
Jocoro's youth squad plays in the twelve-team Primera División Reserves (El Salvador). Current members of the squad are: As of February 2023.

Out on loan

Notable players

Internationals who have played at Jocoro
 Luis Paradela
 Carlos Lanza
 Jamal Jack
 William Maldonado
 Juan Jose Gomez
 Alexander Campos
 Yuvini Salamanca

Most appearances 

Bolded players are currently on the Jocoro FC roster.

Goals

Bolded players are currently on the Jocoro roster.

Personal

Coaching staff

Management

board of directors

Managers
Jocoro have had 20 managers in 27 years. The first manager at the club was TBD.
List of Head Coaches of Jocoro F.C. from when the club was formed:

 * Appointed as coach, coached a few pre-season but resigned before the commencement of the actual campaign.
 ** Won a Title in the Tercera Division 
 *** Appointed as coach, the season was suspended before he coached a game and resigned prior to the commencement of the season 
 † Won the Apertura title in the Segunda Division
 § Won the Clausura title in the Segunda Division
 £ Runner up in the Primera Division 2022 Apertura season 

Managerial records:
 Two man has managed the club through two different spells, Carlos Romero, in 2016 and then 2017-2018, and Rubén Alonso in 2000-2001 and then March 2018-June 2018 .
The longest spell as Jocoro manager was by Ruben Alonso, 2 years (2000–2001)
Uruguayan Ruben Alonso was the first foreign coach to manage Jocoro

References

Football clubs in El Salvador
Association football clubs established in 1995
1995 establishments in El Salvador